Dr. Chan Eng Heng, a retired professor from Universiti Malaysia Terengganu, is a turtle conservationist who has been recognised by the United Nations Environment Program for her efforts to protect sea turtles.

Chan was inducted to the UNEP Global 500 Roll of Honour and became a Global 500 Laureate in 2001 and in 2006 she was listed in the UNEP's Who's Who of Women and the Environment. In 2019, she was conferred the ISTS Lifetime Achievement Award.

Education and career

Dr. Chan Eng Heng was born in Georgetown, Penang, Malaysia in 1950. Completed primary and secondary school education in Convent Light Street and sixth form in St. Xavier's Institution, Chan Obtained BSc (Hons) and MSc degrees from Universiti Sains Malaysia before embarking on an academic career in University Putra Malaysia (previously known as Agriculture University of Malaysia).

In 1993, Chan earned her PhD from Kagoshima University, in Japan, under the RONPAKU scholarship programme of the Japanese Society for the Promotion of Science.

Turtle research 
Chan had co-founded and co-led the Sea Turtle Research Unit aka SEATRU in Universiti Malaysia Terengganu between 1985 and 2009, and retired from the post as a professor.

In 2011, fuelled by her passion to continue working on turtle conservation, Chan co-founded the Turtle Conservation Society of Malaysia. Currently, Chan is serving as its vice-president.

Chan is well known, both locally and abroad for her contributions in the field of turtle research, conservation and education. The recognition of her expertise has been reflected in the various appointments at the national, regional and international levels accorded to her. Chan has also served as turtle expert in numerous regional and international sea turtle workshops, besides having been invited as guest/plenary/keynote speaker at numerous conferences and seminars.

Turtle Alley in Chinatown 
After retirement, Chan also started dabbling in art as a medium to help create awareness on turtles. She helped renovate Kuala Terengganu,  a derelict alley in Chinatown, into a Turtle Alley to celebrate turtles and to bring more awareness to their plight. The alley is adorned with turtle mosaics mounted on the walls as well as along the walkway. Turtle trivia, fact sheets and her book, “Little Turtle Messenger” etched in metallic plates further enhance the educational value of the alley.

Positions

Past
Universiti Sains Malaysia
1. Tutor, 1973–1976
Universiti Pertanian Malaysia
2.  Lecturer, 1976–1991
3. Project Leader, Sea Turtle Research Unit (SEATRU), 1985–2009
4. Associate Professor, 1991–2001
Kolej Universiti Sains dan Teknologi Malaysia
5. Associate Professor, 2001–2002  
6. Department Head, Department of Biological Sciences, 2002–2004
7. Professor, 2002–2006
Universiti Malaysia Terengganu
8. Professor, 2006–2009

Current positions
 Co-Founder and Vice-President, Turtle Conservation Society of Malaysia.
 Member, Turtle Sanctuary Advisory Council, State Government of Terengganu (by appointment)
 Member, Tortoise and Freshwater Turtle Specialist Group, Species Survival Commission, International Union for Conservation of Nature (membership by invitation)
 Field Conservation committee member (South East Asia), Turtle Survival Alliance, USA (by appointment)
 Country Representative, Editorial Board, Indian Ocean Turtle Newsletter (by appointment)
 Technical Advisor, Joint Management Committee, Turtle Islands Heritage Protected Area (by appointment from Sabah Parks)
 Member, Marine Turtle Specialist Group, Species Survival Commission, IUCN (membership by invitation)

Achievements and recognition

Chan is recognised for initiating the first Malaysian in-situ egg protection program for marine turtles in the Chagar Hutang Turtle Sanctuary in Redang Island. Since its inception in 1993, the project has developed into a long-term nesting and tagging research program that incorporates a highly successful volunteer program.
By extending her work to cover the critically endangered river terrapins of Terengganu in 2004, Chan has supported that work evolve into community-based projects in the Setiu and Kemaman Rivers under the Turtle Conservation Society of Malaysia.
Her conferment into the UNEP Global 500 Roll of Honour in 2001 was another mention Chan's contributions in marine turtle conservation were recognised by the United Nations Environment Programme, as well as being listed in the UNEP's Who's Who of Women and the Environment in 2006. In Malaysia, the late Sultan of Terengganu conferred Chan in 1991 the title Pingat Jasa Kebaktian (PJK) in recognition of her contributions in the state. The university has also honored Chan with several research awards.

Authorship 
Many of Chan's written works have been applied directly in the conservation of turtles in Malaysia, either to enhance existing efforts, or to develop new approaches in protecting turtles. Chan has published extensively in peer-reviewed journals, conference proceedings, magazines and newsletters, and a children's book  titled "Little Turtle Messenger" is an educational tool on the field for turtle watchers as well as those young wildlife supporters at home.
Citations of Chan's publications have been printed extensively in the report of the WTO aka World Trade Organization, Panel on the United States – dated 15 May 1998.

TV programmes 
Chan's work on sea turtles has been featured in both local and foreign TV programmes, such as "Beyond 2000″, "World Gone Wild" (Fox Family Channel), "Meeting a New Asia" (NHK), "Our Scientists and Inventors" (Momentum II), as well as TV3′s "Majalah 3″ and "Malaysia Hari Ini".

Save our Turtles Outreach Program (popularly called STOP) that SEATRU projects in Universiti Malaysia Terengganu is another innovative avenue Chan is known for, aiming at endearing turtle conservation to the hearts of the common public. STOP has installed “nest and turtle adoption schemes” and a series of volunteer programs, which involve the public directly in turtle conservation efforts. As attested in the 30-odd media articles on that program, STOP has been highly publicised through wide range of media thresholds.

Chan was conferred a 2019 Lifetime Achievement Award at the International Sea Turtle Symposium.

Research projects

On-going research

Carried out under the Turtle Conservation Society of Malaysia

 Setiu river terrapin recovery project. Seed money has been awarded by the Turtle Conservation Fund (TCF), Turtle Survival Alliance and the Cleveland Metroparks Zoo in the US.
 River terrapin research and conservation project in the Kemaman River, Terengganu. Funded by the Mohamed bin Zayed Species Conservation Fund.

Completed research

While serving at Universiti Malaysia Terengganu and leading the SEATRU, those selected completed research projects Chan has carried out is listed as:

 Satellite tracking of hawksbill turtles from Chagar Hutang Beach, Redang Island – a joint research project with the Southwest Fisheries Science Center Honolulu Laboratory, National Marine Fisheries of NOAA, USA. The satellite transmitter and ARGOS service was fully sponsored by NOAA.
 Satellite-tracking project on Malaysian sea turtles – collaborative research project with Prof. Wataru Sakamoto from Kyoto University, Japan. The satellite transmitter and Argos service was fully sponsored by Kyoto University.
 Tagging and nesting research on the sea turtles of Pulau Redang. Initiated in 1993 in Pulau Redang, it is now continued as a longterm on-going project. IRPA funding was provided under the 6th Malaysia Plan, and donations made by private corporations, international schools and the public fund the project presently.
 In-situ incubation of green turtle eggs in Redang Island. Also supported by donors at private corporations, international schools and the public.
 Radio, ultrasonic and satellite tracking of sea turtles from the Sarawak Turtle Islands – joint research with the Sarawak Forestry Corporation and fully funded by IRPA grants awarded to Sarawak Forestry.
 Sex ratio studies on the green turtles of the Sarawak Turtle Islands. Funded as in above.
 Tagging and nesting research on the sea turtles of Sabah and Sarawak Turtle Islands. Carried out as final year research projects in 2019.
 Radio, ultrasonic and satellite telemetry of the green turtles of Terengganu. Funded by an IRPA grant to KUSTEM scientists.
 Radio-tracking the internesting movements of leatherback turtles. In collaboration with Drs. Scott and Karen Eckert of the US, funded jointly by an IRPA grant and the Terengganu State Government.
 Genetic studies on Malaysian sea turtles. Funded by an IRPA grant to KUSTEM scientists.
 Diving behaviour of leatherback turtles. In Collaboration with Drs. Scott and Karen Eckert of the US, funded jointly by an IRPA grant and the Terengganu State Government.
 Ultrastructure of sea turtle eggshells. In collaboration with Dr. Sally Solomon of the University of Glasgow, during Chan's sabbatical leave.
 Factors affecting hatching success of sea turtle eggs. Funded by the Terengganu State Government.
 Sex-ratio studies on Malaysian sea turtles. Granted by both IRPA and Esso Production Malaysia Sdn. Bhd.
 Effects of fishing gear on sea turtles, grant from Esso Production Malaysia Sdn. Bhd.
 Association of sea turtles with offshore platforms. Esso Production Malaysia Sdn. Bhd. as the collaborator.
 Effects of oil pollution on sea turtles. A review of published information.

Publications

Journals, books and monographs
 Chan, E.H. 2013. A report on the first 16 years of a long-term marine turtle conservation project in Malaysia. (pdf) “Asian Journal of Conservation Biology”, December 2013. 2(2):129–135.
  Chan, E.H. and P.N. Chen. 2011. Getting to know the river terrapins of Malaysia. “Malaysian Naturalist”, 64(3).
  Chan, E.H. and P.N. Chen. 2011. Nesting activity and clutch size of the southern river terrapin, Batagur affinis (Cantor, 1847) in the Setiu River, Terengganu, Malaysia. “Chelonian Conservation and Biology”, 10(1):129–132. 2011.
  Chan, E.H. 2010. A 16-year record of green and hawksbill turtle nesting activity at Chagar Hutang Turtle Sanctuary, Redang Island, Malaysia (PDF). “Indian Ocean Turtle Newsletter”. (12):1–5.
 Chan, E.H. 2010. Little Turtle Messenger. Tan Yi Sin (ill). MPH Group Publishing Sdn. Bhd. 34pp. .
  Pilcher, N.J, E.H. Chan and R. Trono. 2008. Mass turtle poaching: A case study for Southeast Asia  (PDF). “SWOT: The State of the World’s Sea Turtles”, III:26–27.
  Kuchling, G., E.H. Chan and C.L. Soh. 2007. Temperature dependent sex determination studies in the River Terrapin, range country: Malaysia (PDF). “Turtle Survival Alliance Newsletter”. August 2007.
  Chan, E.H. 2006. Marine turtles in Malaysia: On the verge of extinction? (PDF) “Aquatic Ecosystems Health and Management”. 9(2):175–184.
  Chan, E.H. 2005. Profile of the Month – February 2005 (PDF). Indian Ocean-South East Asia Marine Turtle Memorandum of Understanding (IOSEA).
  Chan, E.H. 2004. Turtles in Trouble (PDF). Siri Syarahan Inaugural KUSTEM: (7) 28pp.
  Chan, E.H. and C.R. Shepherd. 2002. Marine Turtles: The Scenario in Southeast Asia (PDF). “Tropical Coasts”, 9(2):38–43.
  Chan E.H. & Liew, H.C. 2002. Saving the turtles saves ourselves (JPEG). “UN Chronicle”, XXXIX(1):38–39.
 Chan, E.H. and H.C. Liew. 2001.  Sea Turtles. pp. 74–75 in Ong, J.E. and W.K. Gong (eds.). “The Encyclopedia of Malaysia”, 6 : The Seas”. Editions Didier Millet. 144 pp.
  Chan, E.H. 2000. And the giants ascended no more (PDF). Millennium Marker story. 10 January 2000, Section 2, “The STAR”, p 8 & 10.
  Chan, E. H., J. Joseph and H.C. Liew. 1999. A study on the hawksbill turtles (Eretmochelys imbricata) of Gulisaan, Sabah Turtle Islands, Malaysia (PDF). “Sabah Parks Journal”. 2:11–23.
  Chai, S.S., H.C. Liew, E.H. Chan and J. Bali. 1999. A comparison of hatch success and sex ratios of green turtle (Chelonia mydas) eggs incubated under in-situ conditions and hatcheries at Pulau Talang-Talang Kecil, Sarawak. “Hornbill”. 3:2–21.
  Wong, C.H.L., E.H. Chan, H.C. Liew and J. Bali. 1999. Tagging and nesting studies of green turtles (Chelonia ' at Pulau Talang-Talang Kecil, Sarawak, ibid:22–36.
  Chan, E. H. and H.C. Liew. 1999. Hawksbill turtles, Eretmochelys imbricata nesting on Redang Island, Terengganu, Malaysia from 1993 to 1997 (PDF). “Chelonian Conservation and Biology”. 3(2):326–329.
  Chan, E. H. and H.C. Liew. 1996. Decline of the leatherback population in Terengganu, Malaysia, 1956–1995 (PDF). “Chel Cons & Biol”. 2(2):196–203.
  Chan, E. H. and H.C. Liew. 1996. A Management Plan for the Green and Hawksbill Turtle Populations of the Sabah Turtle Islands. “A Report to Sabah Parks”. SEATRU, Faculty of Applied Science and Technology, Universiti Pertanian Malaysia Terengganu. 102 pp.
  Eckert, S.A., H.C. Liew, K.L. Eckert and E.H. Chan. 1996. Shallow water diving by leatherback turtles in the  South China Sea (PDF). “Chel Cons & Biol”. 2(2):237–243.
  Luschi, P., F. Papi, H.C. Liew, E.H. Chan and F. Bonadonna. 1996. Long-distance migration and homing after displacement in the green turtle (Chelonia mydas): a satellite tracking study (PDF). “J. Comp. Physiol. A”. 178:447–552.
  Chan, E.H. and H.C. Liew. 1995. Incubation temperatures and sex-ratios in the Malaysian leatherback turtle, Dermochelys coriacea (PDF). “Biol. Conserv.” 2(2):196–203.
  Papi, F., H.C. Liew, P. Luschi and E.H. Chan. 1995. Long-range migratory travel of a green turtle tracked by satellite: evidence for navigational ability in the open sea (PDF). “Marine Biology”. V. 122:171–175.
  Chan, E.H. 1993. The conservation-related biology and ecology of the leatherback turtle, Dermochelys coriacea, in Rantau Abang, Terengganu, Malaysia (PhD dissertation), Kagoshima University, Kagoshima, Japan.
  Chan, E.H. And H.C. Liew. 1989. The Leatherback Turtle : A Malaysian Heritage.  Tropical Press Sdn. Bhd. 49 pp.
  Chan, E.H. and H.C. Liew. 1989. Charting the movements of a sea giant. “Research News”, Universiti Pertanian Malaysia, 3(4):1,7 & 8.
  Chan, E.H. and S.E. Solomon. 1989. The structure and function of the eggshell of the leatherback turtle, (Dermochelys coriacea) from Malaysia, with notes on infective fungal forms (PDF). “Animal Technology”, 40(2):91–102.
  Chan E.H. 1989. White spot development, incubation and hatching success of leatherback turtle (Dermochelys coriacea) eggs from Rantau Abang, Malaysia (PDF). “Copeia”, 1989(1):42–47.
  Chan, E.H. 1988. A note on the feeding of leatherback (Dermochelys coriacea) hatchlings (PDF). “Pertanika”, 11(1):147–149.
  Chan, E.H., H.C. Liew and A.G. Mazlan. 1988. The incidental capture of sea turtles in fishing gear in Terengganu, Malaysia (PDF). “Biol. Conserv.”, 43(1):1–7.
  Chan, E.H. 1985. Twin embryos in unhatched egg of Dermochelys coriacea. “Marine Turtle Newsletter”, (32):2–3.
  Chan, E.H., H.U. Salleh and H.C. Liew. 1985. Effects of handling on hatchability of eggs of the leatherback turtle, Dermochelys coriacea (L.) (PDF). “Pertanika”, 8(2):265–271.

Conferences and proceedings
  Chan, E.H. 2014.  Getting to know the sea turtles of the world. A keynote address at the Launching Ceremony, “the ASiS International Essay and Poetry Writing Competition on "Conserving Our Marine Heritage – Sea Turtles: A Global Perspective,"” Alam Shah Science School, Kuala Lumpur, Malaysia, 14 February 2014.
  Chan, E.H. and P.N. Chen. 2013. Growth of head-started Southern River Terrapins, Batagur affinis edwardmolli in the wild in “the Eleventh Annual Symposium on Conservation and Biology of Tortoises and Freshwater Turtles”, St. Louis, Missouri, USA, 7–10 August 2013.
  Chan, E.H. and P.N. Chen. 2012. Performance of head-started Southern River Terrapins, Batagur affinis edwardmolli in the wild, in “the 7th World Congress of Herpetology”, Vancouver, Canada, 8–14 August 2012.
  Chan, E.H. and Chen, P.N. 2011. Current Status of Batagur in Malaysia. “Conservation of Asian Tortoises and Freshwater Turtles Workshop”, 21–24 February 2011, Singapore.
  Chan, E.H. 2010. 16 Years of Running A Marine Turtle Conservation Project: How Do We Measure Success? “30th Annual Symposium on Sea Turtle Biology and Conservation”, 26–29 April 2010, Goa, India.
  Chan, E.H. 2009. Population Trends in South East Asian Sea Turtles. “Workshop on Regional Cooperation to Address Direct Capture of Sea Turtles”, 1–3 June 2009, Kuala Terengganu, Malaysia.
  Chan, E.H., M.Y. Rozidan, M.S. Shabrina, A. Rahim, M.Y. Noor Nazirah and M.K. Sugenah. 2008. Overview of the Southern River Terrapin, Batagur affinis (Cantor, 1847) Conservation Program in Malaysia, “the 6th World Congress of Herpetology”, 17–22 August 2008, Manaus, Brazil.
  Chan, E.H., Kuchling, G., Soh C.L., and Chen, P.N. 2008. Setiu River Terrapin Research and Recovery Program (PPT). Paper presented at “the 6th Annual Symposium on Conservation and Biology of Freshwater Turtles”, 17–20 September 2008, Tucson, Arizona, USA.
  Chan, K.W., E.H.Chan and H.C. Liew. 2006. Green turtle (Chelonia mydas) hatchling emergence from natural nests in Chagar Hutang, Redang Island, Terengganu. pp. 5–6 in Pilcher, N.J. (Compiler), “Proceedings of the 23rd Annual Symposium on Sea Turtle Biology and Conservation”, 17–21 March 2003, Kuala Lumpur, Malaysia. NOAA Tech. Memo. NMFS-SEFSC-536.
 Chan, S.L., H.C. Liew and E.H. Chan. 2006. Thermal condition in nests of varying clutch sizes of the green turtle (Chelonia mydas) in Redang Islpand, Terengganu. Ibid, p. 6, NOAA Tech. Memo. NMFS-SEFSC-536.
 Chan, E.H. and G. Kuchling. 2005. Sex ratios of river terrapins (Batagur baska) in the head-starting facilities of Malaysia. pp. 36–37, “Fifth World Congress of Herpetology”, Stellenbosch, South Africa.
  Chan, E.H., and C.L. Soh. 2004. Hatching success of river terrapin (Batagur baska) eggs: Impetus for the development of a recovery program for the Setiu River terrapin population in Malaysia. 275pp,  “Proceedings of the XIXth International Congress of Zoology.” 23–27 August 2004, Beijing, China. 564pp. China Zoological Society.
  Chan, E.H., C.L. Soh and C.H. Wong. 2004. Restoration prospects for the river terrapin (Batagur baska) in the Setiu River, Terengganu. pp. 122–126, “Proceedings of KUSTEM’s 3rd Annual Seminar on Sustainability Science and Management.” 4–5 May 2004, Terengganu, Malaysia. 637pp. Kolej Universiti Sains dan Teknologi Malaysia.
  Chan E.H. & Liew, H.C. 2002. Raising funds and public awareness in sea turtle conservation in Malaysia. pp. 25–26, ibid, NOAA Tech. Memo. NMFS-SEFSC-477.
 Bali, J., Liew, H.C., Chan, E.H. & Tisen, O.B. 2002. Long-distance migration of green turtles from the Sarawak Turtle Islands, Malaysia. pp. 32–33, ibid, NOAA Tech. Memo. NMFS-SEFSC-477.
 Liew, H.C. & E.H. Chan. 2002. An Analysis of Tagging Data on the Green Turtles of Redang Island, Malaysia. pp. 135–136, ibid, NOAA Tech. Memo. NMFS-SEFSC-477.
 Joseph, J. and E.H. Chan. 2001. Studies on the population genetics of hawksbill turtles (Eretmochelys imbricata) in Malaysia using microsatellite DNA markers. “21st Annual Symposium on Sea Turtle Biology and Conservation”, 24–28 February 2001, Philadelphia, USA.
 Tan, S.G., W.K. Ng, J. Joseph and E.H. Chan. 2000. Genetic variation in hawksbill turtle (Eretmochelys imbricata) from Malaysia using RAPD markers. M. Shariff, F.M. Yusoff, N. Gopinath, H.M. Ibrahim & R.A. Nik Mustapha (eds.), “Towards Sustainable Management of the Straits of Malacca”. pp. 261–266. MASDEC, Universiti Putra Malaysia, Serdang, Selangor, Malaysia
  Chan, E.H. and H.C. Liew. 1999. The research, conservation and educational activities of SEATRU, The Sea Turtle Research Unit of University College Terengganu. “The 2nd ASEAN Symposium and Workshop on Sea Turtle Biology and Conservation”, 15–17 July 1999, Kota Kinabalu, Sabah, Malaysia.
  Chan, E.H. and H.C. Liew. 1999. Research, conservation and educational activities of the Sea Turtle Research Unit (SEATRU). “Report of the SEAFDECx–ASEAN Regional Workshop on Sea Turtle Conservation and Management”, 26–28 July 1999, Kuala Terengganu, Malaysia. SEAFDEC MFRDMD/RM/6: 235–245.
  Chan, E.H. and H.C. Liew. 1999. “Proceedings of the International Workshop on the migration, foraging habitats and nesting ecology of marine turtles in Taiwan”, 12–14 April 1999, Taipei, Taiwan:
 Public participation in the conservation of sea turtles in Pulau Redang, Malaysia. pp. 44–52.
 Research activities of the Sea Turtle Research Unit (SEATRU) of Universiti Putra Malaysia Terengganu. pp. 52–60.
  Chan, E. H. and H.C. Liew. 1996. A Management Plan for the Green and Hawksbill Turtle Populations of the Sabah Turtle Islands. (A Report to Sabah Parks, 102 pp.) SEATRU, Faculty of Applied Science and Technology, Universiti Pertanian Malaysia Terengganu.
  Chan, E.H., H.C. Liew and F.P. Der. 1996. Beached debris in Pulau Redang and a mainland beach in Terengganu. “Proc.”, A. Sasekumar (ed.) pp. 99–108.  13th Annual Seminar of the Malaysian Society of Marine Sciences on Impact of Development and Pollution on the Coastal Zone in Malaysia, 26 October 1996, Kuala Lumpur, Malaysia.
  Chan, E.H. and H.C. Liew. 1995. In-situ incubation of green turtle eggs in Pulau Redang, Malaysia: Hope after decades of egg exploitation. “Proc.”, pp. 68–72. International Congress of Chelonian Conservation, 6–10 July 1995, Gonfaron, France.
  Liew, H.C. and E.H. Chan. 1995. Long-distance migration of green turtles from Redang Island, Malaysia: The need for regional co-operation in sea turtle conservation. “Proc.”,  pp. 73–75, ibid.
  Liew, H.C. and E.H. Chan. 1993. Biotelemetry of green turtles (Chelonia mydas) during the internesting period in Pulau Redang, Malaysia. pp. 157–163, P. Mancini, S. Fioretti, C. Cristalli and R. Bedini (eds.). “Proceedings of the Twelfth International Symposium on Biotelemetry”, 31 August – 5 September 1992, Ancona, Italy.
  Chan, E.H., S.A. Eckert, H.C. Liew and K.L. Eckert. 1991. Locating the internesting habitats of leatherback turtles (Dermochelys coriacea)'' in Malaysian waters using radiotelemetry. A. Uchiyama and C.J. Amlaner, Jr. (eds.). pp. 133–138, “Biotelemetry XI: Proceedings.” Eleventh International Symposium on Biotelemetry. 29 August – 4 September 1990, Yokohama, Japan. Tokyo : Waseda University Press.
  Chan, E.H. and H.C. Liew. 1990. The offshore protection of Malaysian leatherback turtles. pp. 213–218. S.M. Phang, A. Sasekumar and S. Vickineswary (eds.), “Research Priorities for Marine”, 8 November 1989. Kuala Lumpur : Universiti Malaya.

Footnotes

Notes

References

External links
 Turtle Conservation Society
 Turtle Alley

Living people
Academic staff of Universiti Malaysia Terengganu
1950 births
Conservation biologists